Box spider can refer to:

Crossopriza lyoni, the tailed cellar spider
Gasteracantha cancriformis, the jewel box spider

Animal common name disambiguation pages